Magnopholcomma is a monotypic genus of  comb-footed spiders containing the single species, Magnopholcomma globulus. It was first described by J. Wunderlich in 2008, and is found in Queensland.

Only the male has been described.

See also
 List of Theridiidae species

References

Monotypic Araneomorphae genera
Spiders of Australia
Theridiidae